Andrew Thomson (27 August 1865 – 2 June 1936) was a Scottish footballer who played as a full-back. He earned two caps for Scotland in 1886 and 1889.

Club career
During his career, Thomson played for Levern, Arthurlie and Third Lanark. He won the Scottish Cup with Third Lanark in 1889.

International career
Thomson made his first appearance for Scotland on 20 March 1886, in a 7–2 away win against Ireland. He earned his second and final cap three years later, serving as team captain in a scoreless draw in Wrexham against Wales on 15 April 1889. In some sources, Thomson was mistakenly listed as two different players. He was also selected to play for the Scottish Football League XI and for Renfrewshire and Glasgow in challenge matches.

Personal life
Thomson was born in Grahamston, Barrhead. Later in his life he moved to Pollokshields, where his gold medals were stolen from his home, before retiring to Prestwick, where he died on 2 June 1936 at the age of 70.

See also
List of Scotland national football team captains

References

External links

1865 births
1936 deaths
People from Barrhead
Sportspeople from East Renfrewshire
Scottish footballers
Scotland international footballers
Arthurlie F.C. players
Third Lanark A.C. players
Association football fullbacks
Scottish Football League players
Scottish Football League representative players